David Sklenička (born 8 September 1996) is a Czech professional ice hockey defenseman who is currently playing with Brynäs IF in the Swedish Hockey League.

Playing career
Sklenička made his professional debut playing in Czech Extraliga with HC Plzeň during the 2014–15 Czech Extraliga season as an 18-year old.

In the 2017–18 season, Sklenička played in 49 games on the blueline for Plzeň, registering 14 points and a plus-minus +17 rating. The 21-year-old added one goal and one assist in 10 playoff games.

On May 28, 2018, Sklenička as an undrafted free agent, signed a two-year entry-level contract with the Montreal Canadiens of the National Hockey League (NHL).

Approaching the final year of his contract with the Canadiens in the 2019–20 season, Sklenička continued his tenure with American Hockey League affiliate, the Laval Rocket. After just seven games through the opening months of the season with the Rocket and gaging his chance to appear in the NHL limited, Sklenička was placed on unconditional waivers by the Canadiens and mutually released from his contract on 7 December 2019. On 12 December 2019, he was signed for the remainder of the season to join Finnish club, Jokerit, of the KHL.

Career statistics

Regular season and playoffs

International

References

External links
 

1996 births
Living people
Brynäs IF players
Czech ice hockey defencemen
Jokerit players
Laval Rocket players
Oulun Kärpät players
HC Plzeň players
People from Rakovník
Ice hockey players at the 2022 Winter Olympics
Olympic ice hockey players of the Czech Republic
Sportspeople from the Central Bohemian Region
Czech expatriate ice hockey players in Canada
Czech expatriate ice hockey players in Finland
Czech expatriate ice hockey players in Sweden